Kristian Kvakland (February 5, 1927–October 2, 2011) was a Norwegian sculptor and artist. Among his most famous works is the bronze Amanda-statue of the annual Amanda awards.

Kvakland was born in Orkdal, and was based in Blylaget. His works are represented in a number of public art collections in Norway.

References

External links

Norwegian sculptors
1927 births
2011 deaths
People from Orkdal